Harrisville was a community in Cardston County, Alberta, Canada, to the southwest of Cardston. It had a school district and a Roman Catholic church – the first in the southern part of Alberta – which blew down in 1906. The school closed in 1948.

St. Stephen's Church

St. Stephen's Church in Harrisville was the first Catholic church in the southernmost part of Alberta. It was built in 1899 or 1901 and blew down in 1906. It was rebuilt on a different site in 1907. In 1965 the church was closed. On September 18, 1989, it was listed in the Alberta Register of Historic Places.

See also 

List of communities in Alberta

References 

Localities in Cardston County